The 2019 Valour FC season was the first season in the club's history, as well as the first season in Canadian Premier League history.

Current squad
As of October 16, 2019.

Transfers

In

Transferred in

Loaned in

Draft picks 
Valour FC selected the following players in the 2018 CPL–U Sports Draft on November 12, 2018. Draft picks are not automatically signed to the team roster. Only those who are signed to a contract will be listed as transfers in.

Out

Transferred out

Loan out

Competitions 
Match times are Central Daylight Time (UTC−5).

Preseason

Canadian Premier League

Spring season

League table

2019 CONCACAF League qualification table

Results summary

Results by match

Matches

Fall season

League table

Results summary

Results by round

Matches

Canadian Championship

Statistics

Squad and statistics 

|-

 

 

 

 
 
 
 

  

 
 
 

 
|-
|colspan="12"|Players who left during the season:

 

|}

Top scorers 
{| class="wikitable sortable alternance"  style="font-size:85%; text-align:center; line-height:14px; width:85%;"
|-
!width=10|Rank
!width=10|Nat.
! scope="col" style="width:275px;"|Player
!width=10|Pos.
!width=80|CPL Spring season
!width=80|CPL Fall season
!width=80|Canadian Championship
!width=80|TOTAL
|-
|1|||| Marco Bustos        || MF || 1 || 6 || 1 ||8
|-
|rowspan=2|2|||| Tyler Attardo        || FW || 2 || 4 || 0 ||6
|-
||| Michael Petrasso        || MF || 1 || 5 || 0 ||6
|-
|4|||| Michele Paolucci        || FW || 0 || 3 || 0 ||3
|-
|rowspan=2|5|||| Dylan Carreiro        || MF || 1 || 1 || 0 ||2
|-
||| Ali Musse        || FW || 1 || 1 || 0 ||2
|-
|rowspan=4|7|||| Louis Béland-Goyette        || MF || 0 || 1 || 0 ||1
|-
||| Calum Ferguson        || FW || 1 || 0 || 0 ||1
|-
||| Stephen Hoyle        || FW || 1 || 0 || 0 ||1
|-
||| Dylan Sacramento        || MF || 0 || 1 || 0 ||1
|-
|- class="sortbottom"
| colspan="4"|Totals||8||22||1||31

Top assists 
{| class="wikitable sortable alternance"  style="font-size:85%; text-align:center; line-height:14px; width:85%;"
|-
!width=10|Rank
!width=10|Nat.
! scope="col" style="width:275px;"|Player
!width=10|Pos.
!width=80|CPL Spring season
!width=80|CPL Fall season
!width=80|Canadian Championship
!width=80|TOTAL
|-
|1|||| Michael Petrasso        || MF || 2 || 3 || 0 ||5
|-
|rowspan=2|2|||| Louis Béland-Goyette        || MF || 1 || 2 || 0 ||3
|-
||| Dylan Carreiro        || MF || 0 || 3 || 0 ||3
|-
|rowspan=5|4|||| Marco Bustos        || MF || 0 || 2 || 0 ||2
|-
||| Raphaël Garcia        || DF || 0 || 2 || 0 ||2
|-
||| Ali Musse        || FW || 1 || 1 || 0 ||2
|-
||| Michele Paolucci        || FW || 0 || 2 || 0 ||2
|-
||| Dylan Sacramento        || MF || 1 || 0 || 1 ||2
|-
|rowspan=3|9|||| Martín Arguiñarena        || DF || 1 || 0 || 0 ||1
|-
||| Diego Gutiérrez        || MF || 1 || 0 || 0 ||1
|-
||| Skylar Thomas        || DF || 0 || 1 || 0 ||1
|-
|- class="sortbottom"
| colspan="4"|Totals||7||16||1||24

Clean sheets 
{| class="wikitable sortable alternance"  style="font-size:85%; text-align:center; line-height:14px; width:85%;"
|-
!width=10|Rank
!width=10|Nat.
! scope="col" style="width:275px;"|Player
!width=80|CPL Spring season
!width=80|CPL Fall season
!width=80|Canadian Championship
!width=80|TOTAL
|-
|1|||| Mathias Janssens        || 2 || 2 || 0 ||4
|-
|2|||| Tyson Farago        || 0 || 2 || 0 ||2
|-
|- class="sortbottom"
| colspan="3"|Totals||2||4||0||6

Disciplinary record 
{| class="wikitable sortable alternance"  style="font-size:85%; text-align:center; line-height:14px; width:85%;"
|-
!rowspan="2" width=10|No.
!rowspan="2" width=10|Pos.
!rowspan="2" width=10|Nat.
!rowspan="2" scope="col" style="width:275px;"|Player
!colspan="2" width=80|CPL Spring season
!colspan="2" width=80|CPL Fall season
!colspan="2" width=80|Canadian Championship
!colspan="2" width=80|TOTAL
|-
! !!  !!  !!  !!  !!  !!  !! 
|-
|2||DF|||| Raphaël Garcia               ||2||0||0||0||0||0||2||0
|-
|3||DF|||| Skylar Thomas               ||2||0||3||0||0||0||5||0
|-
|4||DF|||| Jordan Murrell               ||2||0||2||1||0||0||4||1
|-
|5||MF|||| Louis Béland-Goyette         ||4||0||1||0||0||0||5||0
|-
|6||DF|||| Martín Arguiñarena    ||0||0||1||0||0||0||1||0
|-
|8||MF|||| Diego Gutiérrez    ||2||0||2||0||0||0||4||0
|-
|10||MF|||| Dylan Carreiro         ||0||0||3||0||0||0||3||0
|-
|14||MF|||| Nicolás Galvis         ||1||0||0||0||1||0||2||0
|-
|15||DF|||| Adam Mitter               ||0||0||4||1||0||0||4||1
|-
|17||FW|||| Michele Paolucci         ||0||0||2||0||0||0||2||0
|-
|21||MF|||| José Galán         ||0||0||5||0||0||0||5||0
|-
|22||MF|||| Marco Bustos         ||0||0||3||0||1||0||4||0
|-
|26||GK|||| Mathias Janssens         ||1||0||1||0||0||0||2||0
|-
|27||MF|||| Raphael Ohin         ||2||0||7||0||1||0||10||0
|-
|77||MF|||| Federico Peña         ||0||0||1||0||0||0||1||0
|-
|- class="sortbottom"
| colspan="4"|Totals||16||0||35||2||3||0||54||2

References

External links 
2019 Valour FC season at Official Site

Valour FC seasons
Valour FC
VAL
Valour FC